Barnave can refer to:

 Antoine Pierre Joseph Marie Barnave (1761-1793), French politician
 Barnave, Drôme, a commune of the Drôme département in France